Gambrinus is a legendary European culture hero associated with beer.

Gambrinus may also refer to:

Gambrinus (beer), a Czech beer
Gambrinus (beetle), a genus of click beetles in the family Elateridae
Gambrinus (train), a former German train
Gambrinus Brewing Co., a defunct American brewery
the Gambrinus Company, which owns the Spoetzl Brewery
Gambrinus liga, now the Czech First League, a Czech association football competition
Caffè Gambrinus, a cafè in Naples 
King Gambrinus (sculpture), a 1967 sculpture of the folk hero